Trkanje is a village in the municipality of Kočani, North Macedonia.

Demographics
According to the 2002 census, the village had a total of 1,225 inhabitants. Ethnic groups in the village include:

Macedonians 1,224
Serbs 1

References

Villages in Kočani Municipality